Modulate is the studio project of Manchester-based DJ Geoff Lee. They are an Electronic dance music group from Manchester, England. Their sound blends elements of various styles including Electro, Rave, Industrial music, Trance music and Hard dance. The band is signed to Metropolis Records (North America) and Infacted Recordings (Europe/RoW). Modulate live shows also features Steve Wilkins

History
Modulate released several tracks on compilations in 2006; New Input Noise, Endzeit Bunkertracks Act II, and Das Bunker: Fear of a Distorted Planet. 

The band signed to Infacted Recordings, Germany for the European and World market (excluding North America), and the short lived Sistinas Records for the North American market, releasing the debut Skullfuck EP in March 2007.

The Skullfuck EP went into the German Alternative Chart (DAC) and peaked at #6, and #3 in the Greek Alternative Chart giving the band what was described as "the scene's club hit of the year" in ReGen Magazine (USA). 

Their debut full-length release Detonation was released in September 2008, receiving positive reviews in the alternative media and finding its way into the scene's DJ boxes across the globe. The album spent nearly 2 months in both the Top 10 of the German Alternative Chart (DAC) and the Dutch Underground Chart (DUC) and was voted by DJ's into the DAC Top 50 albums of 2008. 

After scoring dancefloor success with his own material, Modulate has become one of the most popular remixers in the alternative electro scene, producing mixes for bands such as Die Krupps, Suicide Commando, Grendel, Aesthetic Perfection, Faderhead, Reaper, Soman and Nachtmahr.

The band has supported Alec Empire (UK leg Past, Present, Future tour), VNV Nation (Judgement tour) and Combichrist (What the Fuck is Wrong with You? tour) sharing the stage with bands such as Front 242, Frontline Assembly, Covenant, Die Krupps, Suicide Commando, And One, playing nearly 100 shows in 11 countries since the release of their first EP.

Live
Modulate played their first live show at the Black Celebration festival at Islington Academy, London, UK, on 5 November 2006. 

2007 –
Toured in support of the Skullfuck EP, joining VNV Nation on the "Judgement Tour" and Combichrist on the "What The Fuck Is Wrong With You Tour". 

2008 –
The band played a four date headline tour in the UK as well as headlining the "I am Darkness" festival in Tillburg, Netherlands.

2009 –
Modulate supported Alec Empire on the UK leg of the Past, Present, Future tour. As well, they played the Summer Darkness festival in Utrecht, Netherlands, before heading over to the USA to headline a night on the Gothic Cruise festival aboard the Carnival Legend.

2010 saw Modulate deliver a co-headline set at the Wave-Gotik-Treffen festival in Leipzig, Germany. The band headlined the DV8 Festival in July in York, UK  and co-headlined the High Voltage Festival in Frankfurt, Germany, on 31 October, before a headline show at the legendary Slimelight club, London, on New Year's Eve. 

In 2011, Modulate continued in the studio and hit the road again with well received sets at the Resistanz (UK) and Kinetik Festival (Canada) festivals plus their own headline ‘Robots’ tour throughout Europe.

Discography
Albums
 Detonation (2008) Metropolis_Records (North America), Infacted Recordings (Europe / R.O.W.), (2009) Gravitator Records (Russia)

EPs 
Skullfuck EP (2007) Sistinas (North America), Infacted Recordings (Europe/R.O.W) 
Skullfuck Limited Edition EP (2007) Sistinas (North America)
Robots (2012) Metropolis_Records (North America), Infacted Recordings (Europe/R.O.W)

Remixes for Artists
Neikka RPM – Sacrifice feat Claus Larsen (Leaether Strip) (2006)
Reaper – Execution of your mind (2007)
Schallfaktor – End of Love (2007)
Faderhead – Dirty Grrrls, Dirty Bois (2007)
XP8 – Download Me (2007)
Soman – Divine (2008)
Die Krupps – Du Lebst Nur Einmal (2008)
SAM – Hardbeat Trauma (2008)
Grendel – Chemicals and Circuitry (2009)
Nachtmahr – Tanzdiktator (2010)
Suicide Commando – Die Motherfucker Die (2010)
Aesthetic Perfection – Devil in the Details (2011)
God Module – Devil’s Night (2011)
Surgyn – Hit the Nerve (2011)
Grendel – Timewave Zero (2012)
Alien Vampires - Harsh Drugs & BDSM (2014)

Compilations
Das Bunker: Fear Of A Distorted Planet (2xCD, Comp) Skullfuck (Beta Mix) Das Bunker 2006 
'Endzeit Bunkertracks [Act II] (4xCD, Comp, Ltd, Car + Box, Ltd) Das Bunker Alfa Matrix 2006
New [Input] Noise (CD) Biomorph Hellektroempire 2006
Endzeit Bunkertracks [Act III] (4xCD, Comp, Car + Box) Skullfuck Alfa Matrix 2007
Infactious Vol. Three (CD, Mixed, Ltd) Skullfuck (Combichrist Remix)(Infacted Recordings 2007)
Materia Fria (CD, Comp) Haunted Faktory Sistinas, Crunch Pod 2007
Nacht Der Maschinen Volume One (CD, Ltd) Kommune 1 Infacted Recordings 2007
Orkus Compilation 28 (CD, Smplr) Skullfuck (ESA Mix) Orkus 2007
Zillo Club Hits Vol. 12 (2xCD, Dig) Kommune 1 Zillo 2007
Extreme Lustlieder 2 (CD, Comp) Hard And Dirty UpScene, Indigo (2) 2008
Extreme Störfrequenz 2 (CD, Comp) Bass Alert UpScene, Indigo (2) 2008
Infacted 4 (2xCD, Comp) Bass Alert Infacted Recordings 2008
Nacht Der Maschinen VolumeTwo (CD, Comp, Ltd) Skullfuck (Combichrist Remix) Infacted Recordings 2008 
Endzeit Bunkertracks [Act – IV] (4xCD, Comp + Box, Ltd) Hard And Dirty (SAM Mix) Alfa Matrix 2009

References

External links

English electronic music groups
Musical groups from Manchester
Metropolis Records artists